The men's 400 metres hurdles at the 2022 World Athletics Championships was held at the Hayward Field in Eugene from 16 to 19 July 2022.

Summary

The podium from the Olympics, the three fastest athletes of all time, all managed to return to the final, but it was a difficult journey.  Olympic Champion/World Record Holder Karsten Warholm pulled up one hurdle into his first race of the season in Rabat and had been on the mend since.  With zero races completed during the season, every race was a season's best.  Silver medalist Rai Benjamin also was nursing injuries but ran well at the American Championships, while bronze medalist Alison dos Santos was scorching the tracks of the Diamond League setting a world leading time of 46.80 in Stockholm, a time only bettered in Olympic finals by Kevin Young, Warhol and Benjamin.

Benjamin had lane 3, where he could see all his key competitors;  Warholm in 4 and Dos Santos in 6, blind to what his key challengers were doing, having to run by his own clock. Warholm was out fast from the gun, making up the stagger on Wilfried Happio by the third hurdle. dos Santos was clearing hurdles just a beat after him. By the sixth hurdle, Warholm had a full stride on dos Santos.  Around the event hurdle, Benjamin started rolling, reeling in the gap Warholm had put on him. Warholm could see he wouldn't make his steps to the eighth hurdle and chopped, taking two extra shortened strides to take the hurdle smoothly. He still had the lead but his momentum was lost, his rivals closing. From the first step off that hurdle Warholm's form deteriorated. dos Santos and then in an instant, Benjamin were past him.  The chase was on for Benjamin, but he couldn't close on dos Santos. Coming from sixth place over the final hurdle, Trevor Bassitt passed Warholm, Jaheel Hyde and finally Harpio to capture bronze.

dos Santos improved his position as the No. 3 athlete of all time with a Championship Record 46.29.  Benjamin's 46.89 was only his third best effort but was the tenth fastest race ever.  Bassitt 47.39 and Harpio 47.41 became the No. 18 and No. 19 athletes of all time.

Records
Before the competition records were as follows:

Qualification standard
The standard to qualify automatically for entry was 48.90.

Schedule
The event schedule, in local time (UTC−7), was as follows:

Results

Heats 

The first 4 athletes in each heat (Q) and the next 4 fastest (q) qualify to the semi-finals.

Semi-finals 
The semifinals started on 17 July at 18:03.

Final 
The final will start on 19 July at 19:50.

References

400 hurdles
400 metres hurdles at the World Athletics Championships